Taj Haider, SI (Urdu: تاج حيدر; born 8 March 1942) is a left-wing politician, nationalist, playwright, mathematician, versatile scholar, and Marxist intellectual. He is one of the founding members of Pakistan Peoples Party (PPP) and has been the general-secretary of the PPP since 2010.

A mathematician and scientist by profession, Haider provided a vital leadership in the formative years of clandestine atomic bomb projects in the 1970s. He is also noted for his writing of political plays for the Pakistan Television (PTV) from 1979 to 1985.

Biography

Education 
Taj Haider was born on 8 March 1942 in Kota, Rajasthan, British Indian Empire. His family migrated to Pakistan following the partition of India in 1947. After graduating from a local high school, Haider ultimately enrolled in Karachi University in 1959. He studied Mathematics at the Karachi University and graduated with a BSc (hons) in Mathematics in 1962.

In 1965, he earned his MSc in mathematics from the same institution and opted for teaching mathematics at the local college, later moving to Karachi University. During his career at the Karachi University, Haider primarily taught and focused on the ordinary differential equations and topics in multivariable calculus.

PPP and political activism 
During the attendance of 1967 socialist convention, Haider was one of the founding members of the Pakistan Peoples Party (PPP) and committed himself as a vehement supporter of change by left-oriented philosophy of Zulfiqar Ali Bhutto. In the 1970s, he played a vital role in formulating the public policy concerning the atomic bomb projects.

On multiple occasions, he provided his expertise on taking moral stance on nuclear weapons initiatives at the diplomatic conventions. On nuclear weapons development, Haider stated that "there was a need to aggressively project the peaceful intent of Pakistan's atomic bomb program."

Haider disassociated himself with the politics but remained member of Pakistan Mathematical Society and shifted towards writing political dramas at the Pakistan Television (PTV) in 1979. The PTV aired various political dramas written by Haider until 1985 when he renewed his association with PPP. In 1990–2000, he contributed in PPP-initiated industrial projects such as the establishment of Heavy Mechanical Complex (HMC), Hub Dam and various other social programmes. He was elected to the Senate of Pakistan in 1995.

In 2001, Haider returned to his literary activities after rejoining the PTV, and penned two political drama serials for the PTV which were aired in 2003. In 2004, he returned to politics in opposition to President Pervez Musharraf over the issue of nuclear proliferation. He bitterly criticised the United States over the sanctions of KRL and one of the noted politician expressing the discontent against the US, along with Raza Rabbani in 2004. About the nuclear proliferation case, Haider defended the case of Abdul Qadeer Khan in the public and condemned the Information minister, Rashid Ahmad's statement of acquitting former Prime minister Benazir Bhutto in the nuclear proliferation case.

Ultimately, he called for a parliamentary inquiry over on that issues, and questioned about the involvement of President General Pervez Musharraf in the proliferation case. In 2006, Haider was awarded PTV Awards for Best Playwright Serial award, which he received in a televised ceremony.

Writing and philosophy
Haider extensively writes on nuclear policy issues, left-wing ideas, literary and political philosophy. His recent writings have included the support of social democracy in the country and power of balance in each state institutions. On literary and political circles, he has written critic articles against the military dictatorship, specifically policies enforced by the conservative President General Zia-ul-Haq throughout the 1980s.

Taj Haider opposed the ethnically-based politics of the leader of Muttahida Qaumi Movement or MQM,  Altaf Hussain based in Karachi by reportedly stating on one occasion, "We were not Mohajirs but Urdu-speaking citizens of this province and this country. Our mother-tongue was the official and national language of Pakistan and it would be wrong and degrading to consider ourselves as lesser citizens or Mohajirs".

Honors and awards
 Sitara-e-Imtiaz (Star of Excellence) Award by the President of Pakistan (2013).  
 13th PTV Awards for Best Playwright Serial award (2006)

Selected articles

Haider, Taj. "CTBT Security Perspectives" Dawn Newspapers, 27 March 2000.
Haider, Taj. "Setting the PPP record straight", Express Tribune 2013.
Haider, Taj. "Why the PPP is boycotting the presidential election", 16 July 2013

Television plays
Jinhein Raaste Main Khabar Hui
Lab-e-Darya

See also

Pakistan Peoples Party
Left-wing politics
Pakistan Academy of Letters
Pakistan Mathematical Society
Pakistan and its Nuclear Deterrent Program

References

External links
Pakistan Peoples Party
https://profilepk.com/ex-senator-taj-haider
https://www.pakpedia.pk/taj-haider/

Living people
1942 births
People from Kota, Rajasthan
Politicians from Karachi
Pakistani people of Rajasthani descent
University of Karachi alumni
Pakistani mathematicians
Pakistani scientists
Pakistan People's Party politicians
Pakistani television directors
Academic staff of the University of Karachi
Pakistani socialists
Government of Benazir Bhutto staffers and personnel
Pakistani political writers
Pakistani media personalities
Pakistani Marxists
Recipients of Sitara-i-Imtiaz
Pakistani philosophers
Pakistani television writers
Pakistani dramatists and playwrights
Pakistani anti-war activists
Pakistani anti–Iraq War activists
Pakistani senators (14th Parliament)
Muslim socialists
PTV Award winners